Helme may refer to:

 Helme, a river in central Germany
Helme Parish, a rural municipality in Valga County, Estonia
Helme, Estonia, a small borough in Helme Parish, Estonia
Helme–Worthy Store and Residence, a historic American home and attached storefront  
Helme, West Yorkshire, a hamlet in England
Schuberth Helme, a German producer of safety helmets

People with that surname

Chris Helme (born 1971), British singer-songwriter
Christopher Helme (1603 – c. 1650), early immigrant to the Massachusetts Bay Colony and one of the founders of Exeter, New Hampshire
Elizabeth Helme (died c. 1814), English novelist and translator of the 18th century 
George Washington Helme (1822 – 1893), American founder of Helmetta, New Jersey
Gerry Helme (1923 – 1981), British rugby league footballer

People with that given name

Helme Heine (born 1941), German writer, illustrator and designer

See also
Helm (disambiguation)